The bilateral relationship between Jordan and Kuwait is considered to be strong, though there are still sporadic tensions. Jordan hosts an embassy in Kuwait City, and Kuwait hosts an embassy in Amman.

History
Both nations, commonly united by their Arab root following the Arab conquests, and the two countries are also shared history under the Ottoman Empire, therefore, the two countries have a close relationship. The two nations are also strongly monarch countries. The two nations first established tie soon after Kuwait's independence. The Prime Minister of Jordan, Omar Razzaz, called it an exemplary.

Throughout the Iran–Iraq War, Jordan, along with Kuwait, were two main backers of Iraq in the conflict against the Islamic regime in Iran. However, following the Gulf War, began with Iraqi invasions of Kuwait, Jordan had been accused of being silent to the plight of many Kuwaitis, including the royal family of Kuwait, Al-Sabah; nonetheless the Jordanians were able to keep balance in relations. After the end of the Gulf War, Jordan became more critical of Saddam Hussein and more sympathetic to Kuwait. Both two countries showed concerns over the blockade of Qatar during the Qatar diplomatic crisis.

Current
The two nations, since the end of the Gulf War, have enjoyed a new era of cooperation. In 2019, Jordan and Kuwait signed 15 agreements to boost the cooperation in every field.

During the 2022 World Cup qualification, with Jordan and Kuwait share similar group, Jordanian supporters were found to have chanted Saddam Hussein, in reference to the Iraqi dictator who invaded Kuwait at 1990. The Kuwaiti government has criticized the chant, and urged the Jordanian government to investigate. 

In September 2020, Jordan and the Kuwait Fund for Arab Economic Development (KFAED) signed two development aid agreements worth US$89 million to finance public education, infrastructure and economic reforms in Jordan.

Ambassadors 
The current Jordanian ambassador to Kuwait is Saqr Abu Shatal. The current Kuwaiti ambassador to Jordan is Aziz Dihani.

References

 
Kuwait
Jordan